Lieutenant Colonel Roy Morell DSO, OBE (24 May 1889 – 28 June 1961) was an Australian wool broker, grazier and stockbroker who volunteered for war service during World War I and World War II.

Birth and education
Morell was born in Wollongong, New South Wales, son of Frances Helen (née Hopkins) and James Harris Morell. He was educated at Wolaroi College and from 1903 at Newington College.

Woolbroker and grazier
After school, Morell worked for Goldsbrough Mort & Co and owned Tullochard  out of Inverell, New South Wales.

War service
On 17 September 1914, Morell enlisted as a sergeant in the 6th Light Horse Regiment, A Squadron, and embarked from Sydney  on 21 December 1914. He served in the Gallipoli Campaign. Morell became a member of the 5th Machine Gun Battalion and served in France. He was promoted to 2nd Lieutenant in August 1915, Lieutenant in October 1915, Captain in March 1916 and Major in March 1917. He married Frances Ione Pole-Carew, a VAD stationed in Malta, on 18 November 1918. Morell returned to Australia on 6 May 1919 and was discharged on 3 July 1919. He volunteered again in the Second World War and as a Lieutenant Colonel was second-in-command in Sydney for Australian Army Movement Control.

Military awards

Stockbroker
In 1936, Morell sold his rural interests and moved to Sydney becoming a sole trader on the Sydney Stock Exchange. In 1939 he became a partner of R.V. Spier & Morell. He was a member of the Stock Exchange committee in 1942, 1946 and 1947.

Community service
Morell was a director of Sydney Hospital and Honorary Teasurer of Fairbridge Farm Schools of NSW. For 23 years he was Honorary Treasurer of the Royal Agricultural Society of New South Wales.

References

1889 births
1961 deaths
Australian military personnel of World War I
People educated at Newington College
Companions of the Distinguished Service Order
Officers of the Order of the British Empire